

Arthropods

Newly named Arachnids

Newly named insects

Archosauromorpha

Newly named dinosaurs
Data courtesy of George Olshevky's dinosaur genera list.

Plesiosaurs
 Plesiosaur gastroliths documented.

References

 Riggs, Elmer Samuel; 1939a; A specimen of Elasmosaurus serpentinus; Geological Series of Field Museum of Natural History; VI(No. 25) pp. 385–391
 Sanders F, Manley K, Carpenter K. Gastroliths from the Lower Cretaceous sauropod Cedarosaurus weiskopfae. In: Tanke D.H, Carpenter K, editors. Mesozoic vertebrate life: new research inspired by the paleontology of Philip J. Currie. Indiana University Press; Bloomington, IN: 2001. pp. 166–180.

1930s in paleontology
Paleontology 9